Kevin Colley (born January 4, 1979) is an American-born Canadian former professional ice hockey right winger who played for the New York Islanders of the NHL, and was the head coach of the Arizona Sundogs of the CHL in 2013–14. He was raised in Collingwood, Ontario.

Playing career
Colley was signed as a free agent by the Islanders on June 11, 2004. Colley fractured his fifth cervical vertebra in a game against the Washington Capitals on January 31, 2006. As a result of the injuries sustained to his neck and at the behest of his doctors, Colley officially retired from professional ice hockey on February 24, 2006. Colley's father, Tom (1953-2021), was a former NHL player.

On April 8, 2006, prior to their game against the Washington Capitals, the Islanders presented Colley with the Bob Nystrom Award, an award given to the Islander "who best exemplifies leadership, hustle and dedication" as voted on by the fans.

Career statistics

Regular season and playoffs

International

References

External links
 

1979 births
Living people
American men's ice hockey centers
Atlantic City Boardwalk Bullies players
Bridgeport Sound Tigers players
Canadian ice hockey centres
Charlotte Checkers (1993–2010) players
Dayton Bombers players
Hartford Wolf Pack players
Ice hockey people from New Haven, Connecticut
New Orleans Brass players
New York Islanders players
Oshawa Generals players
Pensacola Ice Pilots players
Providence Bruins players
Rochester Americans players
Syracuse Crunch players
Undrafted National Hockey League players
Utah Grizzlies (ECHL) coaches
Worcester IceCats players